Guangjiao Temple, may refer to:

 Guangjiao Temple (Xuancheng), in Xuancheng, Anhui, China
 Guangjiao Temple (Nantong), in Nantong, Jiangsu, China